By-elections to the 37th Canadian Parliament were held to fill vacancies in the House of Commons of Canada between the 2000 federal election and the 2004 federal election. The Liberal Party of Canada led a majority government for the entirety of the 37th Canadian Parliament, with little change from by-elections.

Sixteen seats became vacant during the life of the Parliament. Twelve of these vacancies were filled through by-elections, and four seats remained vacant when the 2004 federal election was called.

Overview

2002
Nine federal by-elections were held in 2002.

Berthier—Montcalm, Quebec
At a cocktail party on May 18, 2002, Michel Bellehumeur, Member of Parliament for Berthier—Montcalm, announced his plan to resign from the House of Commons to run for the Parti Québécois in the provincial riding of Joliette, following the resignation of PQ minister Guy Chevrette.

  
|Liberal
|Richard Giroux
|align="right"|11,646  
 
|New Democratic Party
|François Rivest
|align="right"|977   
  
|Progressive Conservative
|Richard Lafleur
|align="right"|598

Lac-Saint-Jean—Saguenay, Quebec

Calgary Southwest, Alberta

Upon his election as leader of the Canadian Alliance, Stephen Harper needed a seat in the House of Commons. Former Reform Party leader Preston Manning resigned his seat to provide a seat for Harper. Harper previously represented the neighbouring riding of Calgary West from 1993–1997, but the seat was already held by MP Rob Anders.

The Liberal Party did not run a candidate against Harper, as a courtesy to allow Harper (as leader of the opposition) to win his seat. 

The NDP selected Bill Phipps, a former leader of the United Church, minister and social activist in the city. Phipps challenged Harper's conservative economic and social views.  During the campaign, Harper commented he "despise[d]" the cleric , and declined to debate him. 

The Green Party chose environmental activist James Kohut, who had previously spoken out in support of the Kyoto Accord and against government subsidies for oil companies, while also calling for lower gas prices for consumers (Calgary Herald, 23 December 2001).

Gordon Barrett, a former candidate for the Social Credit Party of Alberta in Sherwood Park, ran in the riding as an independent.

The leader of the Christian Heritage Party, Ron Gray, was parachuted into the riding in an attempt to win a seat for the CHP in the House of Commons.

Results

On election day, Harper won decisively, winning nearly 72% of the vote. Phipps followed a distant second place, with 20% of the vote. Phipps increased the NDPs vote share by nearly seventeen percent, largely due to the lack of a candidate from the Liberal Party.

Saint Boniface, Manitoba

Bonavista—Trinity—Conception, Newfoundland and Labrador

Gander—Grand Falls, Newfoundland and Labrador

Windsor West, Ontario
The Right Honourable Herb Gray had represented the Windsor-Essex area for nearly forty years when he retired in 2002 to accept a job as Canadian Chair of the International Joint Commission. A by-election was scheduled for May 22, 2002.

The incumbent Liberals chose Richard Pollock, a local lawyer and Liberal organizer, having worked on federal and provincial campaigns in Windsor since 1979. He also served on the executive of the Windsor West Provincial Liberal Association, was the area organizer for the Essex Windsor Liberal Association and worked on Jean Chretien's leadership campaign in 1990. 

The NDP chose Brian Masse, a municipal politician in Windsor's city council. 

The Progressive Conservative Party chose Ian West, who had run against Gray in the previous election. The Canadian Alliance chose Rick Fuschi, an employee in the auto industry.

Chris Holt represented the Green Party and the Christian Heritage Party chose Allan James, a chemical engineer.

Results

The NDP, with Brian Masse, increased their vote by over twenty-five percent, becoming the MP for the riding. The incumbent Liberals lost nearly twenty percent of their vote, coming in a distant second place. The Canadian Alliance and Progressive Conservatives also had a reduction in their vote.

Saint-Léonard—Saint-Michel, Quebec

Verdun—Saint-Henri—Saint-Paul—Pointe-Saint-Charles, Quebec

2003
Three federal by-elections were held in 2003 to fill vacancies in the House of Commons of Canada. These elections were all held during the 37th Canadian Parliament, but at different dates. One election, in the Ontario riding of Perth—Middlesex, was held on May 21, 2003, while the other two by-elections, in the Quebec ridings of Lévis-et-Chutes-de-la-Chaudière and Témiscamingue, were held on June 16

Three seats were vacant at parliament's dissolution. Ottawa Centre became vacant when Liberal Mac Harb was appointed to the Senate on September 9, 2003; Liberal Jean Chrétien resigned as MP for Saint-Maurice on December 12, 2003 when he retired as prime minister and Liberal Allan Rock resigned his Etobicoke Centre seat on December 12, 2003 upon being appointed Ambassador to the United Nations. These vacancies were filled at the subsequent general election rather than through by-elections.

Perth—Middlesex, Ontario
In the 2000 election, Liberal John Richardson was re-elected in the riding of Perth—Middlesex, defeating his rival, Progressive Conservative Gary Schellenberger by approximately 5,000 votes. Schellenberger had run against Richardson in 1997, and had received about 25% of the vote. During the 2000 election campaign, rumours about Richardson's health began to come out, specifically after he missed four all-candidates meetings during the election. He barely campaigned in the 1997 election due to what was thought to be a serious medical condition.

Eventually, Richardson resigned his seat on October 11, 2002, citing personal reasons. It would be revealed years later that Richardson suffered from Alzheimer's Disease.

The resulting by-election was scheduled for May 21, 2003. Gary Schellenberger again ran for the Progressive Conservatives, with the NDP choosing their candidate in the 2000 election, Sam DiNicol to run again. The Liberal party chose farmer and educator Brian Innes, while the Canadian Alliance chose businesswoman Marian Meinen. The Leader of the Christian Heritage Party, Ron Gray, was a parachute candidate in the by-election, in an attempt to give his party representation in parliament.

Results

 

 
     

On election day, Schellenberger defeated Innes by 1,000 votes. The Liberal's loss of the riding to Progressive Conservative candidate Gary Schellenberger was blamed by Prime Minister Jean Chrétien on Richardson's reluctance to leave Canadian politics when his health began deteriorating.

Lévis-et-Chutes-de-la-Chaudière, Quebec
Antoine Dubé, Bloc Québécois MP since 1993, resigned his seat on March 17, 2003 to run in the 2003 Quebec provincial election as a Parti Québécois candidate in Chutes-de-la-Chaudière. That election, held April 14, 2003, was won by Marc Picard.

Prime Minister Chrétien scheduled this by-election, as well as the Témiscamingue by-election, for June 16, 2003. 

The Bloc Québécois chose Maxime Frechette, former parliamentary assistant to Antoine Dubé and former alderman for the city of Saint-Nicolas.  The Liberal Party chose accountant Christian Jobin, the NDP chose social worker Louise Foisy from Lévis, the Progressive Conservatives chose law student and security guard Yohan Nolet from Saint-Nicolas, the Green Party chose industrial entrepreneur Yonnel Bonaventure from Quebec City, the Canadian Alliance chose Philippe Bouchard, a designer from Quebec City and the Marijuana Party chose Benjamin Kasapoglu, a salesperson from Quebec City

Results

The results showed a two-way race between the Liberal Party and the Bloc Québécois, with all other parties not breaking over 5% of the vote. The Liberals increased their vote-share by 21.5% and Christian Jobin was elected MP for the riding. The BQ decreased its vote by nearly 7%, while the Canadian Alliance faced a 13.6% decline in results, bringing their candidate down to 6th place out of seven candidates.

Témiscamingue, Quebec
Pierre Brien of the Bloc Québécois, who, like his colleague Antoine Dubé, was elected in 1993, also decided to run in the 2003 Quebec provincial election. Unlike Dubé, however, Brien decided to run as a member of Action démocratique du Québec. In order to do this, he left the Bloc Québécois to sit as an independent before resigning on March 14, 2003. Brien ran as the ADQ's candidate in Rouyn-Noranda–Témiscamingue, losing to Liberal candidate Daniel Bernard.

Results

References

See also
List of federal by-elections in Canada

37th
2003 elections in Canada
2002 elections in Canada
37th Canadian Parliament